WOW Gospel 2016 is the eighteenth album in the WOW Gospel series. Motown Gospel, RCA Inspiration, Word Records, and Curb Records released the album on January 29, 2016.

Track list

Charts

References

2016 compilation albums
Gospel compilation albums
WOW series albums
Christian music compilation albums